Kanan was a wild tigress who jumped into a zoo enclosure in 1967, lured by a male tiger. Kanan sacrificed her freedom for captive tiger Pradeep and entered his open-air enclosure at the Nandankanan Zoo in Bhubaneswar, Odisha, Eastern India.
Unfortunately, Pradeep would not accept Kanan as he already had a companion named Sikha.

Kanan was celibate until her death on 21 July 1978 without accepting any other mate.

Now, the Kanan Sq. at Nandankanan Zoo "immortalizes this iconic appreciate tale".

References

Individual tigers in India
Bhubaneswar
1978 animal deaths